The 2010 World Allround Speed Skating Championships were held at the indoor ice rink of the Thialf in Heerenveen, Netherlands on 19, 20 and 21 March 2010.

Defending champions were Martina Sáblíková and Sven Kramer. Both succeeded to prolong the title. For Sáblíková it became her second world allround title. Kramer became world allround champion for the fourth time, he is the first person to do so four times in a row. Other world allround champions to win four titles are Ivar Ballangrud and Rintje Ritsma, and only Oscar Mathisen and Clas Thunberg won five times (see Number of World Allround Speed Skating Championships per person).

Jonathan Kuck who became second was the big surprise of the tournament. This 20-year-old former short track skater got  149.558 points which was his PB. Kuck won the 1500 metres and became first in the overall lead. Kuck could skate 5 seconds slower at the 10000 metres to become world allround champion. In the beginning of the 10000 metres he attacked the time Kramer had set in the race before, but in the second half of the race he could not maintain this time schedule.

Men's championships

Day 1

Day 2

1500 metres

Day 3

10000 metres

Results 

NQ = Not qualified for the 10000 m (only the best 12 are qualified)
DNS = Did not start.
RET = Retreated before the lottery of the 10000 m and so Matteo Anesi became qualified.

Women's championships

Day 2

Day 3

Results 

NQ = Not qualified for the 5000 m (only the best 12 are qualified)

Rules 
All 24 participating skaters are allowed to skate the first three distances; 12 skaters may take part on the fourth distance. These 12 skaters are determined by taking the standings on the longest of the first three distances, as well as the samalog standings after three distances, and comparing these lists as follows:

 Skaters among the top 12 on both lists are qualified.
 To make up a total of 12, skaters are then added in order of their best rank on either list. Samalog standings take precedence over the longest-distance standings in the event of a tie.

References

See also 
 Speed skating at the 2010 Winter Olympics

World Allround Speed Skating Championships, 2010
2010 World Allround
World Allround, 2010
World Allround Speed Skating Championships, 2010